= Caesium phosphide =

Identifiers
CAS Number	Cs_{3}P_{7}: 86096-81-3
3D model (JSmol)	Cs_{3}P_{7}: Interactive image
- InChI: Cs_{3}P_{7}: InChI=1S/3Cs.P7/c;;;1-4-2-6-5(1)7(6)3-4/q3*+1;-3 Key: GWFCMYWVEFAKEG-UHFFFAOYSA-N
- SMILES: Cs_{3}P_{7}: [Cs+].[Cs+].[Cs+].[P-]1P2P3[P-]P1[P-]P23

Properties
Chemical formula	Cs_{3}P_{7}
Molar mass	615.53268987 g·mol^{−1}
Appearance	yellow crystals
- Except where otherwise noted, data are given for materials in their standard state (at 25 °C [77 °F], 100 kPa). Infobox references

Caesium phosphide refers to any of several inorganic compounds with the formula CsP_{x}. The most studied member is Cs_{3}P_{7}, which forms yellow crystals of tetragonal structure (P4_{1} group), which turn brown when heated to 300 °C, and colorless when cooled with liquid nitrogen.

Structure of the P_{7}^{3−} subunit as found in Cs_{3}P_{7}.

== Other cesium phosphides ==
CsP_{15} is also claimed. Cs_{4}P_{6} is a layered compound consisting of planar P_{6}^{4−} rings.
